Lithia Springs is a census-designated place and unincorporated area, formerly incorporated as a city, located in northeastern Douglas County, Georgia, United States. As of the 2020 census, the community had a population of 16,644. The area is named for its historic lithia mineral water springs.

Incorporated in 1882, Lithia Springs was dissolved the first time in 1933. Lithia Springs became incorporated again in 1994, to be Douglas County's second completely internal municipality, but disincorporated again in 2000.

In 2000, the citizens voted (80% yea, 20% nay) on December 20 to dissolve the city charter and de-incorporate the city, transferring all assets to the county. The referendum that ended the town was part of the settlement in a lawsuit brought by city residents charging the city should be dissolved because it did not deliver enough services to justify its existence under state law. During its incorporation until 2000, the former city had five mayors.

Lithia Springs is assigned the United States Postal Service ZIP code of 30122.

History

The history of the community begins with Lithia Springs, a natural lithia water spring. So popular were the curative waters that flowed from Lithia Springs that people came for miles to drink it. The neighboring city of Austell was also founded due to the spring's popularity.

In 1887 Judge Bowden bought the springs with a group of investors and started bottling and selling Bowden lithia spring water. That same year the Sweet Water Hotel, a 300-room luxury health resort, opened in Lithia Springs. The Sweet Water Hotel and its famous lithia spring water were so popular that Mark Twain, members of the Vanderbilt family, and Presidents Cleveland, Taft, McKinley and Theodore Roosevelt all enjoyed the many amenities of the resort which included the world-famous Lithia Vapor Baths.

In 1888, the Piedmont Chautauqua Institute opened in Lithia Springs. Henry W. Grady, editor of the Atlanta Constitution, was the founder and gave the institute the motto "Enlightenment of the People". In 1888, over 30,000 tourists, sightseers, and health-seekers visited Lithia Springs GA.

The only remnants of this time that have survived are the natural springs and its historic lithia water under the name brand Lithia, which is still bottled and sold in restaurants and health food stores.

Geography
Lithia Springs is located in the northeastern corner of Douglas County, bordered to the north and east by the Cobb County line and to the south by East County Line Road, Cedar Terrace Road, and Factory Shoals Road. Sweetwater Creek, a tributary of the Chattahoochee River, flows through the eastern part of the community, and Sweetwater Creek State Park is along its southern edge.

Some of the incorporated limits of Douglasville occupy some of the territory within Lithia Springs, along Interstate 20, Blair Bridge Road, Lee Road and Thornton Road.

Parks
Sweetwater Creek State Park is Lithia Springs' main recreational area. The park is home to the George Sparks Reservoir, owned and maintained by the City of East Point. It is home to hiking trails, picnic pavilions, playgrounds and the ruins of the Manchester Mill, a mill destroyed by Sherman's Atlanta Campaign in 1864. In 2005, the remnants of Hurricane Dennis damaged the bridge over the reservoir, the main road into and out of the park. The bridge was rebuilt and the road was reopened in 2006. The park is located off Mount Vernon Road in Lithia Springs.
Woodrow Wilson Park/Lithia Springs Girls Ball Field was a small park surrounded by homes and apartments. The park was well known in the area for its location next to Sweetwater Creek. When heavy rains occurred in the area, the park was prone to flooding. Unfortunately, it was flooded during the 2009 Southeastern United States floods. It isn't currently scheduled to be rebuilt and has been dismantled. The park was located off Mount Vernon Road near Skyview Drive.

Schools
Lithia Springs is home to five schools operated by the Douglas County School System:
Annette Winn Elementary off US. Hwy 78
Lithia Springs Elementary off Junior High Dr.
Sweetwater Elementary off E. County Line Rd.
Turner Middle School next to Lithia Elementary
Chestnut Log Middle School off  Hwy. 92

Library 
Lithia Springs has one library, Betty C. Hagler Public Library, also known as Lithia Springs Public Library.

Economy
There are multiple datacenters in Lithia Springs.

Notable people
Ruth Blair, first woman state historian of Georgia, grew up here
Walton Goggins - Though not born in Lithia Springs, Goggins moved there at a young age and grew up in the area.
American rapper Lil Nas X was born in Lithia Springs.
American Olympian Elana Meyers attended Lithia Springs High School.
NFL player Calvin Pace attended Lithia Springs High School from 1994 to 1998.

Demographics

2020 census

As of the 2020 United States Census, there were 16,644 people, 6,435 households, and 4,159 families residing in the CDP.

2010 census
As of the census of 2010, there were 15,491 people, 6,713 households, and 5,901 families residing in the city. The racial makeup of the city was 39.1% White, 39.5% African American, 0.43% Native American, 0.29% Asian, 0.05% Pacific Islander, 0.34% from other races, and 1.35% from two or more races.  17.6% of the population were Hispanic or Latino of any race.

There were 861 households, out of which 25.7% had children under the age of 18 living with them, 54.4% were married couples living together, 11.3% had a female householder with no husband present, and 29.5% were non-families. 25.0% of all households were made up of individuals, and 11.8% had someone living alone who was 65 years of age or older.  The average household size was 2.41 and the average family size was 2.85.

In the city the population was spread out, with 20.8% under the age of 18, 7.7% from 18 to 24, 27.1% from 25 to 44, 26.5% from 45 to 64, and 17.9% who were 65 years of age or older.  The median age was 42 years. For every 100 females, there were 92.0 males.  For every 100 females age 18 and over, there were 92.2 males.

The median income for a household in the city was $36,029, and the median income for a family was $42,500. Males had a median income of $32,240 versus $25,357 for females. The per capita income for the city was $21,421.  10.2% of the population and 5.8% of families were below the poverty line.   3.0% of those under the age of 18 and 19.5% of those 65 and older were living below the poverty line.

See also
Lithia Spring Water, a brand of bottled natural lithia water sourced from Lithia Springs,Georgia since 1888

References

External links
Douglas County website

Unincorporated communities in Georgia (U.S. state)
Census-designated places in Douglas County, Georgia
Former municipalities in Georgia (U.S. state)
Census-designated places in Georgia (U.S. state)
Populated places disestablished in 2001